BASIC Bank Limited (founded as Bangladesh Small Industries and Commerce Bank) is owned bank in Bangladesh which was founded on 2 August 1988. The bank was founded to finance small enterprises. Abul Hashem is chairman of the bank. Md. Anisur Rahman is the managing director of the bank. More than 45 billion taka loan was defaulted from the bank, many of the loans were to companies that existed on paper only, with the support of former chairperson Sheikh Abdul Hye Bachhu. 100 borrowers accounted for 86 percent of the defaulted loans.

History
BASIC Bank Limited was established on 2 August 1988 began operations from 21 January 1989. It was owned by BCC Foundation, which owned 70 percent of the shares, and the government of Bangladesh, which owned the remaining 30 percent of the shares. On 4 June 1992, BCCI, which owned BCC Foundation, closed and the government of Bangladesh took over 100 percent ownership.

In December 2003, Basic Bank signed an agreement with International Leasing and Financial Services Limited to provide loans.

Basic Bank donated to the Chief Adviser's Relief and Welfare Fund in 2007.

In 2009, Dewan Zakir Hossain, Secretary at the Ministry of Information, was appointed chairman of BASIC Bank Limited.

Sheikh Abdul Hye Bacchu resigned as chairman of the bank following 4.5 billion taka in defaulted loans on 5 July 2014.

Basic Bank fired its managing director, Kazi Faqurul Islam, in 2015 over financial irregularities at the bank following an investigation by Bangladesh Bank.

BASIC Bank Limited is one of seven state owned banks in Bangladesh. In 2016 the finance minister in a statement described the state of the bank as weak due to graft by top officials of the bank and would require some time for improvement. Sonali Bank UK Ltd and other international banks had censured Basic bank over irregularities. Since 2012 Basic bank had been frozen out of international transactions as a result of the irregularities. In October 2016, A Monayem Khan, Deputy managing director of the bank was fired.

Two deputy managing directors, Fazlu Sobhan and Mohammad Selim, and former Deputy General Manager Shiper Ahmed were sent to prison for embezzlement. The Anti Corruption Commission had filed 56 cases against 156 people in 2015 over the embezzlement of 20 billion taka. Bangladesh bank estimated 45 billion had been swindled from the bank during the six years the time Sheikh Abdul Hye Bachhu served as the chairman of the bank. Among the accused was the former managing director Kazi Fakhrul Islam.

The parliamentary standing committee on finance ministry and Bangladesh Supreme Court criticised the Anti Corruption Commission for failure to name Sheikh Abdul Hye Bachhu in its investigation report of the bank and failure to find his involvement. There was allegations that Anti Corruption Commission did not file cases against former chairman Sheikh Abdul Hye Bacchu because he is "Jatiya Party leader" and had "connections at high positions". Sheikh Abdul Hye Bacchu has denied the allegations. Following a report by Bangladesh Bank to the Anti Corruption Commission, The Daily Star described BASIC bank as being "blatantly looted".

Mahjabeen Morshed, member of parliament of Jatiya Party, was sued by the Anti Corruption Commission for embezzling 2.75 billion taka from the bank.

In December 2019, employees of BASIC bank confined the directors of the bank demanding the bank scrap changes to the wage structure. The bank had recently cut the salaries of its employees citing issues with generating revenue.

The Minister of Finance, AHM Mustafa Kamal, considered merging BASIC Bank Limited with Bangladesh Development Bank Limited in 2021.

Board of directors

References

External links

 BB intelligence digs into traffickers’ bank accounts.
 Accumulated bad loans of 56 banks in Bangladesh over Tk 546.57 billion

Banks of Bangladesh
Banks established in 1988
1988 establishments in Bangladesh